Emilie Turunen (born 13 May 1984 in Copenhagen, Denmark) is a former Member of the European Parliament (MEP). She was elected to represent the Danish constituency in the 2009 European election as a member of the Socialistisk Folkeparti and the European Green Party. She later switched party affiliation to the Social Democrats and the Party of European Socialists.

Life
Turunen graduated from Roskilde University in Social Science and Working Life Studies and lives with her boyfriend in northwest Copenhagen. Before being elected she was in charge of the Youth of the Socialist People's Party and worked with the Danish Social Forum.

In Parliament
After being elected to the European Parliament, Turunen has become vice-chairperson of the Green-Free Alliance group, a member of the Internal Market and Consumer Protection Committee, a member of the delegation to south east Asia. She is also a substitute on the Employment and Social Affair Committee, the Special Committee on the Financial, Economic and Social Crisis and the delegation to Iran. She is particularly active against the trafficking of women. After Swedish MEP Amelia Andersdotter, Turunen is also the youngest MEP of the 7th European Parliament. On March 20, 2013 she left Socialistisk Folkeparti for the Social Democrat.

References

External links
 EP profile

1984 births
Living people
Socialist People's Party (Denmark) MEPs
MEPs for Denmark 2009–2014
Danish people of Finnish descent
Politicians from Copenhagen